Pizzo di Zocca is a mountain of the Bregaglia Range, located on the border between Switzerland and Italy. Its summit lies between the valleys of Albigna (in the Swiss canton of Graubünden) and Val di Mello (in the Italian region of Lombardy).

References

External links
Pizzo di Zocca on Hikr

Mountains of the Alps
Alpine three-thousanders
Mountains of Lombardy
Mountains of Graubünden
Mountains of Switzerland
Bregaglia